2007 Desafio Internacional das Estrelas was the third edition of Desafio Internacional das Estrelas (International Challenge of the Stars) held on November 23 – November 25, 2007. It was won by Michael Schumacher.

In the qualification for the race Nelson Piquet Jr. took pole position. The event had two races with points gathered from both races, although the second race gave less points. The first eight finishers from the first race were then reversed for the start of the second race with the rest starting the second race as they were classified in the first race. Race one winner was Michael Schumacher and the second race was won by Lucas di Grassi. After the two races Michael Schumacher had gathered the most points (35) ahead of Luciano Burti (33 points) and Lucas di Grassi (31 points). Thus, he was declared the champion in his first participation of the event.

Qualifying

Race 1

Race 1 winner Michael Schumacher's average speed was 90.62 km/h.
Race 1 fastest lap was by Rubens Barrichello 40.681s

Race 2

Race 2 winner Lucas di Grassi's average speed was 89.75 km/h.
Race 2 fastest lap was by Michael Schumacher 40.956s

Final classification

References

2007
Desafio